Pierre Baratin (7 September 1920 – 23 May 1995) was a French racing cyclist. He rode in the 1948 Tour de France.

References

External links
 

1920 births
1995 deaths
French male cyclists
Sportspeople from Rhône (department)
Cyclists from Auvergne-Rhône-Alpes